Lake Guinas is the larger of only two permanent natural lakes in Namibia. It is a sinkhole lake, created by a collapsing karst cave; it is located thirty-eight kilometres west of Tsumeb, near the D3043 road.

Lake Guinas is home to Tilapia guinasana, a critically endangered species of cichlid fish that is endemic to this lake. It has later been introduced to Guinas' sister lake, Lake Otjikoto, as well as into few farm dams nearby. The claim that lake Guinas is indeed connected to lake Otjikoto by caves is frequently made but not proven as yet.

The lake is situated on private farmland but can be visited with the permission of the owner.

References

Guinas
Tsumeb
Sinkholes of Africa